Allophylus is a genus within the plant family Sapindaceae.

A list of species (incomplete):
 Allophylus agbala Hauman
 Central Africa (DRC)
 Allophylus aldabricus Radlk.
 Indian Ocean (Seychelles)
 Allophylus bullatus Radlk.
 Central Africa
 Allophylus chartaceus  (Kurz) Radlkofer
 South/Southeast Asia
 Allophylus chirindensis Baker f.
 Southern Africa
 Allophylus cobbe (L.) Rausch.
 Pantropical
 Allophylus decipiens (E.Mey.) Radlk.
 Southern Africa
 Allophylus dodsonii A.H.Gentry
 South America (Ecuador)
 Allophylus edulis (St.Hil.) Radlk.
 South America
 Allophylus hispidus (Thwaites) Trimen
 South Asia (Sri Lanka)
 Allophylus marquesensis F. Brown
 Oceania (French Polynesia)
 Allophylus natalensis (Sond.) De Winter
 Southern Africa
 Allophylus pachyphyllus Radlk.
 Caribbean (Jamaica)
 Allophylus rapensis F. Brown
 Oceania (French Polynesia)
 Allophylus rhoidiphyllus Balf. f.
 Middle East (Yemen)
 Allophylus rhomboidalis (Nadeaud) Radlkofer
 Oceania (French Polynesia/Pitcairn)
 Allophylus roigii Lippold
 Caribbean (Cuba)
 Allophylus zeylanicus L.
 South Asia (Sri Lanka)
 Allophylus zimmermannianus Gilg ex Engl.
 East Africa

External links

 
Sapindaceae genera
Taxonomy articles created by Polbot